Shahumyan formerly known as Molla Dursun, is a village in the Armavir Province of Armenia. It was renamed after Stepan Shahumyan, an Armenian Bolshevik commissar.

See also 
Armavir Province
Armavir, Armenia

References 

Populated places in Armavir Province
Yazidi populated places in Armenia